The Arrowhead Library System (ALS) is the regional public library system that serves the seven counties in northeastern Minnesota and is geographically the largest public library system in the state. The seven counties served are Carlton, Cook, Itasca, Koochiching, Lake, Lake of the Woods, and St. Louis for a total population of 308,012 (as of 2008) people served. There are 29 member libraries in the system with a total of 2,392,726 items circulated in 2008.

As of July 1, 2012, the Arrowhead Library System is the regional multi-type library system as well the regional public library system. Therefore, ALS will be serving their constituents by "promoting and facilitating cooperation among the academic, public, school library media centers, and special libraries" as well as continuing to provide the member public libraries with support to "provide free access to library services for all residents of the region without discrimination."

Mission
"The mission of the Arrowhead Library System is to deliver highly responsive and accessible library service to its member libraries and people of the region through a collaborative network of coordinated programs."

Legacy Funding
Libraries in Minnesota receive a portion of funding from the Minnesota Legacy Amendment under the Arts and Cultural Heritage funding allocation. In 2011, the Arrowhead Library System received $457,762.74 in Legacy Funding and was able to provide 134 programs to 22,496 residents in northeastern Minnesota.

Member Libraries

Public Libraries
Aurora Public Library
Babbitt Public Library
Baudette Public Library
Bovey Public Library
Buhl Public Library
Calumet Public Library
Carlton Public Library
Chisholm Public Library
Cloquet Public Library
Coleraine Public Library
Cook Public Library
Duluth Public Library
Ely Public Library
Eveleth Public Library
Gilbert Public Library
Grand Marais Public Library
Grand Rapids Area Library
Hibbing public Library
Hoyt Lakes Public Library
International Falls Public Library
Keewatin Public Library
Kinney Public Library
Marble Public Library
McKinley Public Library
Moose Lake Public Library
Mt. Iron Public Library
Silver Bay Public Library
Two Harbors Public Library
Virginia Public Library

References

County library systems in Minnesota
Education in Carlton County, Minnesota
Cook County, Minnesota
Education in Itasca County, Minnesota
Education in Koochiching County, Minnesota
Education in Lake County, Minnesota
Education in Lake of the Woods County, Minnesota
Education in St. Louis County, Minnesota